Maszkowice  is a village in the administrative district of Gmina Łącko, within Nowy Sącz County, Lesser Poland Voivodeship, in southern Poland.

The archaeological site Zyndram's Hill is located in Maszkowice.

References

Maszkowice